Thomas "Tom" Howell (born October 14, 1994) is an American curler from Bentleyville, Ohio.

Teams

Men's

Mixed

Mixed doubles

References

External links

 
 
 Our Team — YoungBucks USA
 
 Video: 

Living people
1994 births
Sportspeople from Newton, Massachusetts
American male curlers
American curling champions
Marquette University alumni
Competitors at the 2013 Winter Universiade
Curlers at the 2012 Winter Youth Olympics
Sportspeople from Cuyahoga County, Ohio